Lester Oriel Moré Henningham (born 15 July 1978) is a Cuban former professional footballer who played as a forward. He is the Cuba national team's all-time record goalscorer, with 30.

Club career
Moré played for over a decade for his hometown team, Ciego de Ávila, in his native Cuba, prior to his defection to the United States in 2008. He won the Campeonato Nacional de Fútbol de Cuba with Ciego de Ávila in 2001 and 2003. He scored a Cuban league record of 32 goals in the 2002–03 season and 123 league goals in total.

He played with Charleston Battery in 2008, featuring in eleven games before being released at the end of the season. He played for Club Atlético River Plate Puerto Rico in 2009, before moving back to the United States to play for the amateur Los Angeles Azul Legends in the USL Premier Development League in 2010, alongside former Cuba national teammate Eders Roldan.

International career
Moré made his debut for Cuba in 1995 and was a squad member at the 1998, 2003, 2005 and 2007 Gold Cup Finals.

He also played in 17 FIFA World Cup qualification matches between 1996 and 2004. He has collected a total of 62 caps, scoring 29 goals, making him the top scorer of the national team.

Defection to the United States
His final appearance for the national team was at the CONCACAF Gold Cup in June 2007 against Mexico. During the tournament, Moré and Osvaldo Alonso fled the Cuban team camp, effectively defecting from Cuba.

Career statistics
Scores and results list Cuba's goal tally first, score column indicates score after each Moré goal.

References

External links
 Player profile - Charleston Battery
 

1978 births
Living people
People from Ciego de Ávila
Defecting Cuban footballers
Cuban footballers
Association football forwards
Cuba international footballers
1998 CONCACAF Gold Cup players
2003 CONCACAF Gold Cup players
2005 CONCACAF Gold Cup players
2007 CONCACAF Gold Cup players
FC Ciego de Ávila players
Charleston Battery players
Club Atlético River Plate Puerto Rico players
LA Laguna FC players
USL First Division players
USL League Two players
Cuban expatriate footballers
Expatriate soccer players in the United States
Expatriate footballers in Puerto Rico
Cuban expatriate sportspeople in the United States
Cuban expatriate sportspeople in Puerto Rico